is a Japanese singer and pianist. She was a member of AKB48. Concurrently as a student specializing in piano at Tokyo College of Music, she has released a piano instrumental album Kokyū Suru Piano on October 3, 2012, which reached number 10 on Oricon's albums chart.


Discography

AKB48

Solo albums
 ja:Kokyū Suru Piano (2012) - Reached number 10 on Oricon. Sales: 10,263

Filmography
 Bingo (2012)

References

External links
 AKB48 Official profile 
 Pony Canyon Official profile  
 Official Blog 
 Sakiko Matsui (English page) on　Google+

1990 births
Living people
AKB48 members
Japanese idols
Japanese classical pianists
Japanese women pianists
Japanese women pop singers
Pony Canyon artists
Musicians from Saitama Prefecture
21st-century Japanese women singers
21st-century Japanese singers
21st-century classical pianists
21st-century women pianists